Changaliwala is a village in Sub division Lehragaga in Sangrur district in the state of Punjab. It is located 40 km to the south of District headquarters Sangrur, 149 km from State capital Chandigarh. Earlier the village was called Kartarpura, named after Numberdar Kartar Singh. But as many people migrated here from Changal Village in District Sangrur, it was renamed Changaliwala.

Geography
Changaliwala (village) is located at  3 km from Lehragaga to Sunam Main Road.

Demographics

 India census,  Changaliwala had a population of 988. Males 525  and females 463. There were 174 households.

References

Villages in Sangrur district